The 2021 European Orienteering Championships was held from 13 to 16 May 2021 in Neuchâtel, Switzerland.

Medal summary

Medal table

Men

Women

Mixed

References

External links
 Official website

European Orienteering Championships
2021 in Swiss sport
International sports competitions hosted by Switzerland
Sport in Neuchâtel
Orienteering in Switzerland
European Orienteering Championships
2021 in orienteering